Tin Goose can refer to the following:

 The Ford Trimotor, a 1933 airplane
 The 1948 Tucker Sedan, a 1948 automobile